Romy Schneider (1938–1982) was a German-French actress who was involved in a number of motion picture films in Germany and then France.

Filmography

References

Filmography
German filmographies
French filmographies
Actress filmographies